Czech Republic–Iraq relations are bilateral relations between the Czech Republic and Iraq.  The Czech Republic has an embassy in Baghdad, and Iraq has an embassy in Prague. They have involved military cooperation foreign and humanitarian aid, as well as Czech participation as part of the multinational force in Iraq.

See also 
Foreign relations of the Czech Republic 
Foreign relations of Iraq
Czech Republic–Kurdistan Region relations

References

 

Foreign relations of the Czech Republic
Foreign relations of Iraq
Czech Republic–Iraq relations